First-seeded Alice Marble defeated second-seeded Helen Jacobs 6–2, 6–3 in the final to win the women's singles tennis title at the 1940 U.S. National Championships. The tournament was played on outdoor grass courts and held from September 2, through September 7, 1940 at the West Side Tennis Club in Forest Hills, Queens, New York.

The draw consisted of 55 players of which seven were seeded.

Seeds
The eight seeded U.S. players are listed below. Alice Marble is the champion; others show in brackets the round in which they were eliminated.

  Alice Marble (champion)
  Helen Jacobs (finalist)
  Pauline Betz (quarterfinals)
  Dorothy Bundy (quarterfinals)
  Sarah Cooke (third round)
  Helen Bernhard (quarterfinals)
  Virginia Wolfenden (quarterfinals)

Draw

Final eight

References

1940
1940 in American women's sports
1940 in women's tennis
Women's Singles
Women's sports in New York (state)
Women in New York City
1940 in New York City
Forest Hills, Queens